Justin Walley is an English football manager who is the press and communications director of the Marshall Islands Soccer Federation.

Career

In 2007, Walley founded Latvian side Riga United. After that, he was appointed manager of Matabeleland. In 2023, he was appointed press and communications director of the Marshall Islands Soccer Federation.

References

Association football forwards
Association football wingers
English expatriate footballers
English expatriate sportspeople in Japan
English expatriate sportspeople in Latvia
English expatriate sportspeople in Zimbabwe
English football managers
English footballers
Expatriate football managers in Latvia
Expatriate football managers in Sierra Leone
Expatriate football managers in Zimbabwe
Expatriate footballers in Japan
Living people
Year of birth missing (living people)